This article is about the particular significance of the year 1977 to Wales and its people.

Incumbents

Secretary of State for Wales – John Morris
Archbishop of Wales – Gwilym Williams, Bishop of Bangor
Archdruid of the National Eisteddfod of Wales – Bryn

Events
6 January - Roy Jenkins becomes President of the European Commission.
26 March - Operation Julie results in the break-up of a drugs ring centred on Llanddewi Brefi and the recovery of 1.5 kg of LSD.
date unknown
The Welsh Health Common Services Authority is created.
Moss Evans is elected leader of the Transport and General Workers Union.
Mount Stuart Primary School, Cardiff, appoints Betty Campbell, the first black female head teacher in Wales
Opening of the bilingual secondary school, Ysgol Uwchradd Bodedern, on Anglesey.

Arts and literature

Awards
Ian Parrott receives the John Edwards Memorial Award from the Guild for the Promotion of Welsh Music.
Jonathan Pryce wins a Tony award for his performance on Broadway in The Comedians.
National Eisteddfod of Wales (held in Wrexham)
National Eisteddfod of Wales: Chair - Donald Evans
National Eisteddfod of Wales: Crown - Donald Evans
National Eisteddfod of Wales: Prose Medal - Robert Gerallt Jones
Wales Book of the Year (Welsh language) - Owain Owain, Mical, (Gwasg Gomer)

New books

English language
Alice Thomas Ellis - The Sin Eater
Paul Ferris - Dylan Thomas: The Biography
Raymond Garlick - Incense
Ellis Peters - A Morbid Taste for Bones (first in the Brother Cadfael series of novels)
Craig Thomas - Firefox
Gwyn Alf Williams - Goya and the Impossible Revolution

Welsh language
Käte Bosse-Griffiths - Byd y Dyn HysbysZonia Bowen - Llydaweg i'r CymroJane Edwards - Dros Fryniau Bro AfallonDonald Evans - EginOwain Owain - MicalR. J. Rowlands - Cerddi R. J. Rowlands y BalaGwyn Thomas - Cadwynau yn y MeddwlMusic
Injaroc - Halen Y DdaearDafydd Iwan - Carlo a Chaneuon Eraill, I'r GadPunk rock band The Toilets is formed in Rhyl, predecessor of The Alarm.

Film
Richard Burton receives his sixth Best Actor nomination at the Academy Awards for his role in Equus.

Broadcasting

Welsh-language radio
3 January - BBC Radio Cymru begins broadcasting.

Welsh-language televisionGlas Y Dorlan (sitcom)

English-language televisionKilvert's DiaryArchitecture
Castell Gyrn (Denbighshire) is built by John Taylor of Chapman Taylor architects for himself.

Sport
Athletics - The first UK Athletics Championships are held at Cwmbran.
BBC Wales Sports Personality of the Year – Phil Bennett
Billiards - Clive Everton reaches the semi-finals of the World Championship.
Boxing - Johnny Owen wins the British bantamweight title.
Darts - Wales wins the Home International Series and the first Darts World Cup.
Fencing - Wales wins the Quadrangular Tournament.
Greyhound racing - Cardiff Greyhounds closes and the Welsh Greyhound Derby is run for the last time.
Rugby union - Wales win the Triple Crown.
Long-distance swimming - David Jones of Port Talbot becomes the first Welshman to swim the Bristol Channel.
Formation of the Welsh Hang Gliding Association and the Welsh Federation of Coarse Anglers.
Snooker - Doug Mountjoy wins the Masters, defeating Ray Reardon in an all-Welsh final.

Births
3 February - Mike Powell, cricketer
26 February - Shane Williams, rugby player
4 March - Gareth Wyatt, rugby player
16 March - Steve Jones, TV presenter
18 March - Alex Jones, TV presenter
10 April - David Phelps, sport shooter
12 April - Jason Price, footballer
20 April - Robert Wilfort, actor
27 April - Edward Elwyn Jones, organist and conductor
30 April - Robert Evans, playwright
11 September 
 Jonny Buckland, English-born musician 
 Matthew Stevens, snooker player
18 November - Deiniol Jones, rugby player

Deaths
10 February - Grace Williams, composer, 70
11 February - Thomas Ifor Rees, diplomat, 86
22 February - Hubert William Lewis, Victoria Cross recipient, 80
5 March - Tom Pryce, Formula One racing driver, 27
20 March - Glyn Gething, rugby player, 84
25 March - Aubrey Williams, army officer, 88
30 March - Sir William Emrys Williams, 80
5 April - Meirion Thomas, botanist and plant physiologist, 82
18 April - Irene Steer, Olympic swimmer, 87
22 April - Ryan Davies, entertainer, 40
27 May - Jac L Williams, educationist
12 June - Ronnie James, British champion boxer, 59
27 June - Bert Day, Wales international rugby union player, 69
26 July - Sir Ben Bowen Thomas, civil servant and academic, 78
10 August - Watcyn Thomas, rugby player, 71
16 August - (at Colchester) Hugh Iorys Hughes, engineer, 75
27 September - Llewelyn Wyn Griffith, author of Up to Mametz, 87
1 November - Jim Sullivan, rugby league player, 73
11 December - Neil Williams, Canadian-born aerobatics pilot, 33date unknown'' - Cecil Smith, footballer

See also
1977 in Northern Ireland

References 

 
Wales
 Wales